Regeneration: Being an Account of the Social Work of the Salvation Army in Great Britain is a 1910 non fiction book by H. Rider Haggard.

References

External links
Complete book at Internet Archive

1910 non-fiction books
Works by H. Rider Haggard